Cheboksary Cooperative Institute  is an educational institute in Cheboksary.  The institute  has  an ongoing exchange of students and professors with  counterparts in Syracuse University, Case Western Reserve University  and Chuvash State University. The cooperative operates the International Institute of Entrepreneurship and Management. Its current rector is Valery Andreyev.

References 

 Cheboksary Cooperative Institute

Cheboksary